Sydney Earl Chaplin (March 30, 1926 – March 3, 2009) was an American actor. He was the second son of Charlie Chaplin and Lita Grey. One of his major roles was in his father's film Limelight (1952). In theater, Chaplin won the Tony Award for Best Featured Actor in a Musical for his 1957 performance in Bells Are Ringing.

Early years
Born in 1926 in Beverly Hills, California, Chaplin was the second son of Charlie Chaplin and Lita Grey. His parents had married in November 1924 when Lita became pregnant with Sydney's elder brother Charles. Sydney was born five weeks prematurely, 10 months after the birth of his older brother. He was named for his father's half-brother, Sydney Chaplin. His parents divorced a year after his birth. The boys later had eight half-siblings from their father's fourth marriage to Oona O'Neill.

His mother insisted on calling him "Tommy" due to her distaste for his namesake uncle. Sydney and his older brother were brought up mostly by their maternal grandmother, while his mother attempted to advance her career as a singer. The family spent most of one year in Nice, where the boys became fluent in French.

Chaplin was educated at the boarding schools Black-Foxe Military Institute and Lawrenceville School in New Jersey, as well as the public North Hollywood High School.

Career 
After serving in the United States Army during World War II in Europe, Chaplin returned to California, where he became involved in acting both on stage and in films. He gained early acting experience in The Circle Theater, now known as El Centro Theatre, including acting in three plays directed by his father.

He also appeared in several Broadway productions, including Bells Are Ringing opposite Judy Holliday in 1957, for which he won a Tony Award for Best Performance by a Featured Actor in a Musical. In 1959, he costarred with Lauren Bacall in George Axelrod's comedy Goodbye Charlie and headlined Jule Styne's 1961 musical Subways Are for Sleeping. He played in Funny Girl opposite Barbra Streisand in 1964, for which he was nominated for a Tony Award. Chaplin also had supporting roles in two of his father's films, Limelight (1952) and A Countess from Hong Kong (1967).

Chaplin retired from acting in the 1970s. In the 1980s, he owned and managed a restaurant, Chaplin's, in Palm Springs, California.

Following his retirement from acting, Chaplin seldom made public appearances. Exceptions included his attendance at Cinecon in Los Angeles in 1998, and at the Cineteca di Bologna 2002 festival (Il Cinema Ritrovato), which mounted a fiftieth-anniversary screening of Limelight. He appeared also at the San Francisco Silent Film Festival in 2004, where he spoke after screenings of his father's film The Circus to promote film historian Jeffrey Vance's Chaplin books.

Personal life 
In 1960 Chaplin married French dancer and actress Noëlle Adam, by whom he had one son, Stephan (born 1960). In 1985 this marriage ended in divorce.

He became involved with Margaret Beebe in 1984. They married in 1998, and remained married until Chaplin's death.

Book 
Chaplin helped complete and publish his mother's 1998 autobiography, Wife of the Life of the Party. He also wrote the book's foreword, where he shared some of his own history and private thoughts on his parents.

Death
On March 3, 2009, Chaplin died at his home in Rancho Mirage, California, of a stroke, at the age of 82, just 4 weeks short of his 83rd birthday.

Filmography

References

Further reading
Grey, Lita. My Life With Chaplin, Grove Press. 1966.
Chaplin, Lita Grey; Vance, Jeffrey. Wife of the Life of the Party. Foreword by Sydney Chaplin. Lanham, MD: Scarecrow Press, 1998 pg. ix-xi-3. .
Guardian obituary

External links

1926 births
2009 deaths
20th-century American male actors
United States Army personnel of World War II
Military personnel from California
Male actors from Beverly Hills, California
American male film actors
American male musical theatre actors
American male stage actors
Sydney
People from Greater Los Angeles
Tony Award winners